Razorline was an imprint of American comic book company Marvel Comics that ran from 1993 to 1995. It was created by filmmaker and horror/fantasy novelist Clive Barker, with its characters existing  in one of the many alternate universes outside the mainstream continuity known as the Marvel Universe.

Publication history

The Razorline imprint consisted of four interrelated titles, based on Barker's detailed premises, titles and lead characters. 
These were:
 Ectokid — written first by James Robinson, then by Lana Wachowski, and pencilled  by Steve Skroce
 Hokum & Hex — written by Frank Lovece, penciled by Anthony Williams 
 Hyperkind — written by Fred Burke, pencilled by Paris Cullins and inked by Bob Petrecca 
 Saint Sinner — written by Elaine Lee, pencilled and inked by Max Douglas

Marcus McLaurin was the editor. The four titles were preceded by a one-shot sampler cover-titled: Razorline: First Cut.

As Barker described:

Razorline was launched in 1993 as several other publishers, including Malibu Comics, Defiant Comics, and Dark Horse Comics, were launching superhero lines. The line lasted under a year. There was a second wave of titles that were written but were not released. Comics historians Keith Dallas and Jason Sacks analyzed that "by the summer of 1993 the market was so oversaturated with new titles and new universes, there was no room for imprints as unique as the Barkerverse to stand out".

In 2005, the appendix page of the Official Handbook of the Marvel Universe one-shot involving alternate universes revealed that the Earth of the Razorline imprint is designated as Earth-45828. Relatively real-world, without other superheroes, it includes Marvel Comics as a comic-book publisher, with Razorline characters making references to "X-Men comics" and to Marvel editor Stan Lee's Fantastic Four writing.

Hokum & Hex and Hyperkind were superhero series, while the other two were supernatural series. All were released with a Comics Code seal. The Razorline's short run of seven to nine issues each was due in large part to market conditions.

Two one-shots followed: Hyperkind Unleashed (which included a "Hokum & Hex" prose short story) and Ektokid Unleashed (which included a "Saint Sinner" prose short story).

Other titles
Before the cancellations, several issues of four subsequent series were in various stages of completion: Wraitheart (written by Frank Lovece, art by Hector Gomez), Schizm (written by Fred Burke), Mode Extreme (written by Sarah Byam), and Fusion Force.

Columnist and former comics publisher Cat Yronwode wrote:

In other media
A 2002 Barker telefilm titled Saint Sinner bore no relation to the comic. In Barker's words: "I was always disappointed with the way that Marvel handled that entire line of comics, particularly Saint Sinner. I thought that's a waste of a good title. It was something that called for finding a new life in some way or another".

See also 
 Marvel Comics multiverse

References

External links 
 
 Razorline at The Unofficial Handbook of Marvel Comics Creators. Archived on May 7, 2013
 Clive Barker's Razorline at An International Catalogue of Superheroes. Archived from the original on October 4, 2012.

 "Comics" at CliveBarker.com (unofficial site). Archived from the original on December 31, 2010.

Marvel Comics dimensions
Marvel Comics imprints
Horror comics
Superhero comics